Joni Nikko (born 31 May 1994) is a Finnish professional ice hockey player. He is currently playing for Boro/Vetlanda HC of the Swedish Hockeytvåan (Div.2)

Nikko made his Liiga debut playing with Lukko during the 2011–12 SM-liiga season. He has also featured with KalPa, SaiPa, and Vaasan Sport in the top tier.

References

External links

1994 births
Living people
Finnish ice hockey left wingers
Iisalmen Peli-Karhut players
Imatran Ketterä players
KalPa players
Lukko players
Mikkelin Jukurit players
Sportspeople from Vaasa
SaiPa players
Vaasan Sport players